Ahmed Rashed may refer to:

 Ahmed Rashed (Egyptian footballer) (born 1928), Egyptian footballer
 Ahmed Rashed (footballer, born 1988), Emirati footballer
 Ahmed Rashed (footballer, born 1997), Emirati footballer